The women's football tournament at the 2012 Summer Olympics in London was held from 25 July to 9 August 2012. The women's tournament was a full international tournament with no restrictions on age. The twelve national teams involved in the tournament were required to register a squad of 18 players, including two goalkeepers. Additionally, teams could name a maximum of four alternate players, numbered from 19 to 22. The alternate list could contain at most three outfielders, as at least one slot was reserved for a goalkeeper. In the event of serious injury during the tournament, an injured player could be replaced by one of the players in the alternate list. Only players in these squads were eligible to take part in the tournament.

The age listed for each player is on 25 July 2012, the first day of the tournament. The numbers of caps and goals listed for each player do not include any matches played after the start of the tournament. The club listed is the club for which the player last played a competitive match prior to the tournament. A flag is included for coaches who are of a different nationality than their own national team.

Group E

Brazil
Head coach: Jorge Barcellos

Brazil named a squad of 18 players and 4 alternates for the tournament. Prior to the tournament, Elaine withdrew injured and was replaced on 23 July 2012 by Danielli, who was initially selected as an alternate player. Gabi Zanotti subsequently filled the vacant alternate spot.

Cameroon
Head coach: Carl Enow

Cameroon named a squad of 18 players and 4 alternates for the tournament.

Great Britain
Head coach: Hope Powell

Great Britain named a squad of 18 players and 4 alternates for the tournament. During the tournament, Dunia Susi replaced Ifeoma Dieke on 30 July 2012 due to injury.

New Zealand
Head coach:  Tony Readings

New Zealand named a squad of 18 players and 4 alternates for the tournament.

Group F

Canada
Head coach:  John Herdman

Canada named a squad of 18 players and 4 alternates for the tournament. During the tournament, Melanie Booth replaced Emily Zurrer and Marie-Ève Nault replaced Robyn Gayle on 30 July 2012 due to injury.

Japan
Head coach: Norio Sasaki

Japan named a squad of 18 players and 4 alternates for the tournament.

South Africa
Head coach: Joseph Mkhonza

South Africa named a squad of 18 players and 4 alternates for the tournament.

Sweden
Head coach: Thomas Dennerby

Sweden named a squad of 18 players and 4 alternates for the tournament.

Group G

Colombia
Head coach: Ricardo Rozo

Colombia named a squad of 18 players and 4 alternates for the tournament.

France
Head coach: Bruno Bini

France named a squad of 18 players and 4 alternates for the tournament.

North Korea
Head coach: Sin Ui-gun

North Korea named a squad of 18 players and 4 alternates for the tournament. During the tournament, Choe Yong-sim replaced Kwon Song-hwa on 25 July and Kim Su-gyong replaced Ro Chol-ok on 31 July 2012 due to injury.

United States
Head coach:  Pia Sundhage

The United States named a squad of 18 players and 4 alternates for the tournament.

References

External links
 Olympic Football Tournaments London 2012 – Women, FIFA.com
 

Squads
2012